Narciso Esquivel y Salazar  (died 1876) was a Costa Rican politician. He was a signer of the Costa Rican Act of Independence in 1821.

His son Aniceto Esquivel Sáenz later became President of the Republic of Costa Rica.

Costa Rican politicians
Year of birth missing
1876 deaths